Tit-Ebya (Tiit-Ebe) is a rural locality (a selo) and the administrative center of Zhemkonsky 1-y Rural Okrug of Khangalassky District in the Sakha Republic, Russia, located  from Pokrovsk, the administrative center of the district. Its population as of the 2002 Census was 802.

Geography
The village is located by the bank of a branch of the Lena, near the mouth of river Menda, flowing from the Lena Plateau.

References

Notes

Sources
Official website of the Sakha Republic. Registry of the Administrative-Territorial Divisions of the Sakha Republic. Khangalassky District. 

Rural localities in Khangalassky District